Fort Waldegrave was a battery or an emplacement for heavy guns in St. John’s Newfoundland, strategically overlooking the Narrows and St John’s Harbour.

Original purpose
It was originally constructed in 1798 where Old North Castle had first been located and was used as a support battery for Chain Rock. It was named after Governor Waldegrave. The fort is located on the slopes of Signal Hill.

They are 174 meters apart. At nightfall, a large defensive chain was stretched between the rocks by means of a capstan to prevent enemy ships from entering the harbor. Chain Rock and Pancake Rock were used for this purpose as early as 1770.

Apart from a guardhouse at Fort Waldegrave,  there were two cannon, and a magazine capable of travelling.

The fortifications on the opposite side of the Narrows were named for Lieutenant Colonel William Amherst who successfully recaptured St. John's from French forces in 1762.  The Seven Years' War was fought from 1756–1763 where France and Britain fought for superiority in French North America.
In 1762, toward the end of the war, French forces attacked St. John's, Newfoundland. If successful, the expedition would have strengthened France's hand at the negotiating table. Though they took St. John's and raided nearby settlements, the French forces were eventually defeated by British troops at the Battle of Signal Hill. This was the final battle of the war in North America, and it forced the French to surrender to the British under Amherst. The British government now controlled all of eastern North America.

The battery was rebuilt in 1810 and was maintained until the end of 1860s.

Use of Fort in World War I
During World War I,  on July 8, 1916, Fort Waldegrave  became important as the sole active defense site for St. John’s. A BL 6 inch gun Mk II was mounted atop a gun carriage within a protective circular stone wall. In February 1916, the ship was renamed . Royal Navy Reservists from the ship who were each equipped with a .303 rifle, assisted the Legion of Frontiersmen who were commanded by Lieutenant Edward W. Vere Holloway and Sergeant Joseph Russell.

A small barracks and mess hall with office facilities were also located nearby along with two powder magazines. They were surrounded by a stone wall with gates. However, during World War I the Fort saw no action.

In 1920 the barrack building was sold and became a dance hall. The wall and other buildings were dismantled and used to repair the Anglican Cathedral of St. John the Baptist as well as home foundations, during the 1940s.  The circular stone wall around the gun remains in place from World War I.

During World War I the chain was replaced with anti-submarine nets

Use of Fort in World War II
During World War II  The Chain  Rock was once again used to attach a  large chain and anti-submarine boom  connecting to Fort Amherst above Pancake Rock, so as to prevent the entry of German U-boats into the harbour.

Local Neighbourhood
The Battery is also the name  that describes a small neighbourhood within the city of St. John's, Newfoundland and Labrador where Fort Waldegrave was located. In the 1920s a large stone building was built near the foot of the headland and was initially used as a hotel, the Hotel Newfoundland. In the Lower Battery area where US Army Dock Road is now located, there were at one time, railway tracks.

Grand Concourse Authority
The Grand Concourse,  is a network of walkways that covers  the metropolitan area of the Newfoundland and Labrador Provincial Capital, St. John's, as well as its neighbouring communities of Mount Pearl and Paradise.  It is 125 km long and  links rivers, lakes and ponds, parks and green spaces, and historical sites such as Fort Waldegrave.  This fort can be found by following the walkway indicated on the website named "Concourse Harbourside Walk East". The Authority also  sets up informational  boards  at various points of interest on the walkways.

Notes

External links
 Signal Hill National Historic Site - Parks Canada
  A cruise ship passes between the Narrows

References
 Parsons, W. David (2003), "Newfoundland and the Great War", published in Canada and the Great War: Western Front Association Papers.  McGill-Queen's University Press. .
 Georges Cerbelaud-Salagnac, La reprise de Terre-Neuve par les Français en 1762, revue française d'histoire d'outre-mer, tome LXIII, 1976, numéro 231
 Major Evan W. H. Fyers, The Loss and Recapture of St. John's, Newfoundland, in 1762, Army Historical Research, Volume XI, 1932
 André de Visme, Terre-Neuve 1762 : Dernier combat aux portes de la Nouvelle-France, Montréal, 2005, 

Military history of Newfoundland
Military forts in Newfoundland and Labrador
Coastal fortifications
History of St. John's, Newfoundland and Labrador
Populated coastal places in Canada